Norfolk Island competed at the 2022 Commonwealth Games in Birmingham, England between 28 July and 8 August 2022. It will be Norfolk Island's tenth appearance at the Games.

Lawn bowlers Tim Sheridan and Shae Wilson were the delegation's flagbearers during the opening ceremony.

Competitors
Norfolk Island is sending a contingent of 14 (10 athletes and 4 officials) to the Games.

The following is the list of number of competitors participating at the Games per sport/discipline.

Lawn bowls

Norfolk Island selected a squad of ten bowlers (five per gender).

Men

Women

References

External links
Team Norfolk Island Facebook site

Nations at the 2022 Commonwealth Games
Norfolk Island at the Commonwealth Games
2022 in Norfolk Island